The Best of Celly Cel is the first greatest hits album by  Vallejo, California rapper, Celly Cel.  The album was released in 1999 and was Celly Cel's last project for Jive Records.

Track listing 
"It's Goin' Down" (Remix) feat. Rappin' 4-Tay, E-40, B-Legit, & Mack 10 – 5:35
"Pop the Trunk" feat. UGK – 4:04
"Heat 4 Yo Azz" – 4:22
"Fuck tha World" feat. Silkk the Shocker – 4:08
"Red Rum" feat. Spice 1 – 4:26
"Get a Real Job" – 4:39
"Hot Sunny Day" feat. Levitti & Marjuna Mitchell – 5:58
"4 tha Scrilla" feat. E-40, T-Bone & B-Legit – 4:09
"Tha Bullet" – 4:44
"Ride" feat. C-Bo – 3:50
"Remember Where You Came From" – 4:10
"How to Catch a Bitch" feat. E-40, Mugzi & T-Pup – 4:22
"Can't Tell Me Shit" – 5:18
"It's Goin' Down" – 5:25

References

Celly Cel albums
1999 greatest hits albums
Gangsta rap compilation albums